Taylor Edwin Hackford (born December 31, 1944) is an American film director and former president of the Directors Guild of America. He won the Academy Award for Best Live Action Short Film for Teenage Father (1979). Hackford went on to direct a number of highly regarded feature films, most notably An Officer and a Gentleman (1982) and Ray (2004), the latter of which saw him nominated for the Academy Award for Best Director and the Academy Award for Best Picture.

Early life
Hackford was born in Santa Barbara, California, the son of Mary (née Taylor), a waitress, and Joseph Hackford. He graduated from the University of Southern California in 1968, where he was a pre-law major focusing on international relations and economics. After graduating, he served as a Peace Corps volunteer in Bolivia, where he started using Super 8 film in his spare time. The camera was purchased for him by fellow Peace Corps volunteer, Steve Ball. He decided that he did not want to pursue a career in law, and instead got a mailroom position at KCET-TV. At KCET he was the associate producer on the Leon Russell special "Homewood" in 1970. In 1973 at KCET he produced the one-hour special Bukowski (about the poet Charles Bukowski), directed by Richard Davies.

Career
The Idolmaker starred Ray Sharkey, who was awarded a Golden Globe for Best Actor for his portrayal of "Vinnie" in the film. The Music Supervisor was Richard Flanzer. Hackford said of The Idolmaker, "I make films about working-class people; showbusiness is one of those things through which people can get themselves out of the lower rung of society. To me, the compelling story in The Idolmaker is the guy with a wonderful talent and a fairly strong ego has to make it happen through puppets."

During the filming of An Officer and a Gentleman, Hackford kept Lou Gossett Jr. in separate living quarters from the other actors so he could intimidate them more during his scenes as a drill instructor. Richard Gere originally balked at shooting the ending, which involves his character arriving at his lover's factory wearing his Navy dress whites and carrying her off from the factory floor. Gere thought the ending would not work because it was too sentimental, and Hackford was initially inclined to agree with Gere, until during a rehearsal when the extras playing the workers began to cheer and cry. But when Gere saw the scene later with the music underneath it at the right tempo, he said it sent chills up the back of his neck, and is now convinced Hackford made the right decision.

In 1983, Taylor Hackford partnered with Keith Barish, film producer, to co-develop a film version of At Play in the Fields of the Lord, of which both Hackford and Barish received a lawsuit in 1986, claiming it had an option to exercise the rights from MGM/UA Entertainment Co., a film distributor.

Hackford said of his film Ray: "My proudest moments in Ray were in those 'chitlin' clubs. Ray Charles ended his life in concert halls, where people would go in tuxedos and quietly listen to a genius perform. But in these clubs, he had to get people up dancing. What I tried to create was a little of that energy and exuberance. The great thing about music is when you can get people on their feet."

In a 2005 interview, Hackford confirmed that he never watched his own films: "When I finish a film, I put it away and I never look at it again. Occasionally I do now because of the DVDs and the commentary tracks. I usually put it aside and go onto the next. I never went to film school. I worked for the KCET public television station in L.A. I worked in concerts. I have done a lot of music. I feel very comfortable shooting music, and I think you can see that." Hackford has also directed music videos, including "Against All Odds (Take a Look at Me Now)" by Phil Collins and "Say You, Say Me" by Lionel Richie.

On July 25, 2009, Hackford was elected president of the Directors Guild of America. He was re-elected to a second, two-year term as president on June 25, 2011, at the DGA's National Biennial Convention in Los Angeles.

Personal life
Hackford has been married three times. He married his first wife, Georgie Lowres, in 1967; they have one child, Rio Hackford (1970–2022). The couple divorced in 1972. In 1977, Hackford married Lynne Littman, with whom he has one child, Alexander Hackford, born in 1979; their marriage lasted until 1987. Hackford has been married to Academy Award-winning actress Helen Mirren since 1997.

Hackford met Mirren when he was directing her in White Nights, although their first meeting did not go well: he kept her waiting to audition for White Nights, and she was icy. "It was a strange way to meet Helen, because she is a lovely person", says Hackford, "but she didn’t hold back her fury." Hackford and Mirren wed in 1997, although as a young woman Mirren had vowed never to marry.  The couple live along the Nevada side of Lake Tahoe.

In 2009, Hackford signed a petition in support of director Roman Polanski, calling for his release after his arrest in Switzerland in relation to his 1977 charge for statutory rape.

Filmography 

 
Executive producer only
 Rooftops (1989)
 The Long Walk Home (1990)
 Queens Logic (1991)
 Mortal Thoughts (1991)
 Sweet Talker (1991)
 Defenseless (1991)
 A Place to Stand (2014) (Documentary)

Producer only
 La Bamba (1987)
 When We Were Kings (1996) (Documentary)
 G:MT – Greenwich Mean Time (1999)

References

External links

Peace Corps biography of Taylor Hackford news clips
 "Notable Former Volunteers / Arts and Literature". Peace Corps official site. Accessed 5 January 2007.

1944 births
Living people
Film directors from California
Presidents of the Directors Guild of America
Directors of Live Action Short Film Academy Award winners
CAS Filmmaker Award honorees
Golden Orange Honorary Award winners
Grammy Award winners
USC School of International Relations alumni
Peace Corps volunteers
Activists from California
People from Santa Barbara, California